Short is a surname of English origin. Notable people with this surname include:

 Alan Short (1920–2004), California legislator
 C. Alan Short (born 1955), British architect and academic
 Arthur Short (cricketer) (born 1947), South African cricketer
 Arthur Short (politician) (1850–1933), politician in the British colony of South Australia
 Arthur Ernest William Short (1890–1949), South Australian businessman and city councillor
 Arthur Rendle Short (1880–1953), professor of surgery at Bristol University
 Augustus Short (1802–1883), "Bishop Short", British-born Australian religious leader
 Bob Short (1917–1982), American sports team owner
 Bobby Short (1924–2005), American musician
 Brandon Short (born 1977), American football player
 Chris Short (1937–1991), American baseball player
 Clare Short (born 1946), British politician
 Clyde Short, (born 1883), Kansas politician
 Columbus Short (born 1982), American dance choreographer and actor
 Craig Short (born 1968), British football player
 E L Short (born 1925), member of the Sixty-sixth Texas Legislature
 Edward Short (judge) (1806–1871), Canadian jurist and politician
 Edward Short, Baron Glenamara (1912–2014), British politician
 Elizabeth Short (1924–1947), American murder victim known as the "Black Dahlia"
 Emily Short, writer of interactive fiction
 Eustace Short (1875–1932), co-founder of Short Brothers
 Gene Short (born 1953), American basketball player
 Gertrude Short (1902–1968), American film actress
 Gregory Short (1938–1999), American classical music composer
 Harry Short (1864–1937), Canadian politician
 Harry Short (baseball) (1878–1954), American baseball player and manager
 Horace Short (1872–1917), co-founder of Short Brothers
 Hassard Short (1877–1956), Broadway musical director
 Jack Short (betrayer of William Wallace) (fl. 1300s), Scottish servant and betrayer of Sir William Wallace
 Jake Short (born 1998), US Television Actor
 James Short (mathematician) (1710–1768), British mathematician, optician, and telescope builder
 Florence Jane Short (aka Rachel Peace) (1881–after 1932), British feminist and suffragette, who was imprisoned and force-fed
 Jason Short (born 1978), American football player
 Jay Short (born 1939), American biochemist and biotech entrepreneur
 J. D. Short (1902–1962), American Delta blues musician
 Joseph Short (1904–1952), American journalist
 Kayle Short (born 1973), Canadian hockey player
 Keith Short (1941–2020), British sculptor
 Leonie Short (born 1956), Australian politician
 Lester L. Short (born 1933), American ornithologist
 Luke Short (1854–1893), American gunfighter
 Luke Short (writer) (1908–1975), American writer
 Martin Short (born 1950), Canadian actor and comedian
 Nathaniel Short (born 1985), English footballer
 Nigel Short (born 1965), British chess player
 Obadiah Short (1803–1886), British artist
 Oswald Short (1883–1969), co-founder of Short Brothers
 Patrick Short (fl. c. 1830), British-born religious leader
 Patrick Short (1859–1941), Queensland police commissioner
 Peter Short (clergyman) (born 1948), Canadian minister, Moderator of the United Church of Canada
 Peter Short (field hockey) (born 1976), Canadian field hockey player
 Peter Short (printer) (died 1603), English printer
 Peter Short (rugby union) (born 1979), English rugby union player
 Phil Short (born 1947), U.S. Army officer and Louisiana politician
 Philip Short (born 1945), British journalist and author
 Philip Short (chess player) (1960–2018), Irish chess player
 Rick Short (born 1972), American baseball player and coach
 Rob Short (born 1972), British-born hockey player
 Robert L. Short (1932–2009), American religious writer and minister
 Roger Short (1944–2003), British diplomat
 Shawn Short (born 1978), American dance choreographer
 Sidney Howe Short (1858–1902), American inventor, professor, businessman
 Thomas Vowler Short (1790–1872), English clergyman and academic
 Tom Short (born 1957), American Christian traveling evangelist
 Walter Short (1880–1949), American soldier
 Wilfrid Short (1870–1947), British civil servant
 William Henry Short (1884–1916), British soldier
 William J. Short (fl. 1920s), Canadian politician from Manitoba
 William Short (Alberta politician) (1866–1926), mayor of Edmonton, Alberta, Canada
 William Short (American ambassador) (1759–1849), Thomas Jefferson's private secretary
 Zack Short (born 1995), American baseball player

Fictional characters 
 Holly Short, in the Artemis Fowl series

See also
 Short (disambiguation)
 Shortt (disambiguation)
 Short Brothers, British aerospace company

References

English-language surnames
Surnames of English origin
Surnames from nicknames